Neil Fraser Cowie (born 16 January 1967) is an English former professional rugby league footballer who played in the 1990s and 2000s.

Background
Neil Cowie was born in Todmorden, West Riding of Yorkshire, England.

Playing career

Club career
Cowie signed for Rochdale Hornets in 1986 and went on to make 16 appearances in his first season. His blockbusting performances caught the attention of Wigan and he signed for them at the end of the 1990–91 season. The transfer fee was set by a tribunal, with Wigan paying an initial £65,000 to Rochdale, plus an additional £15,000 when Cowie made his international debut.

During the 1991–92 season, Cowie played for defending champions Wigan as a substitute in their 1991 World Club Challenge victory against the visiting Penrith Panthers.

During the 1992–93 season, Cowie was a substitute (replacing Steve Hampson) in Wigan's 5–4 victory over St Helens in the 1992 Lancashire Cup Final at Knowsley Road, St Helens on 18 October 1992. He also played in Wigan's 15–8 victory over Bradford Northern in the 1992–93 Regal Trophy Final at Elland Road, Leeds on 23 January 1993,

During the 1993–94 season, Cowie played in the 2–33 defeat by Castleford in the 1993–94 Regal Trophy Final at Elland Road, Leeds on 22 January 1994.

During the 1994–95 season, Cowie played in the 40–10 victory over Warrington in the 1994–95 Regal Trophy Final at Alfred McAlpine Stadium, Huddersfield on 28 January 1995.

During the 1995–96 season, Cowie played in the 25–16 victory over St Helens in the 1995–96 Regal Trophy Final at Alfred McAlpine Stadium, Huddersfield on 13 January 1996.

Cowie played for Wigan Warriors from the bench in their 1998 Super League Grand Final victory over Leeds Rhinos.

In June 2000, Cowie converted a drop goal, the only one-pointer he scored in his career, in a 30–18 victory over the Bradford Bulls. He played for Wigan at prop forward in their 2000 Super League Grand Final loss against St Helens.

Cowie played for Wigan Warriors from the bench in their 2001 Super League Grand Final defeat by the Bradford Bulls. This turned out to be his last appearance for the club, as he announced his retirement shortly after the match.

Representative career
Cowie was selected to go on the 1992 Great Britain Lions tour of Australia and New Zealand.

Cowie won caps for Wales while at Wigan in 1995 against England, and France, and in the 1995 Rugby League World Cup against Western Samoa, in 1996 against England, in 1998 against England, and in 1999 against Ireland, and Scotland, and won caps for Great Britain while at Wigan in 1993 against France, and in 1998 against New Zealand (2 matches). Cowie was also selected for the 2000 Rugby League World Cup, but withdrew from the squad due to injury.

References

External links
Statistics at wigan.rlfans.com
Grand Finalists set for tight match
Bradford bulldoze Wigan
Bradford bulldoze Warriors
Cowie set for Sunday showdown
Cowie mulls retirement, Halligan bows out
Woodsy on … Wigan Warriors

1967 births
Living people
English people of Welsh descent
English rugby league players
Great Britain national rugby league team players
People from Todmorden
Rochdale Hornets players
Rugby league players from Yorkshire
Rugby league props
Sportspeople from Yorkshire
Wales national rugby league team captains
Wales national rugby league team players
Wigan Warriors players